Fred, Fredric, Frederic, or Frederick Harris may refer to:

Arts and entertainment
 Fred Harris (presenter) (fl. 1970s–present), British comedian and television presenter
 Frederick Harris (conductor) (fl. 2000s–present), American conductor
 Frederick Harris (painter), painted The Red Door, a watercolor of the Temple of Literature, Hanoi

Politics and law
 Frederick Rutherfoord Harris (1856–1920), British politician, MP for Monmouth Boroughs and Dulwich
 Leverton Harris (Frederick Leverton Harris, 1864–1926), British politician, MP for Tynemouth, Stepney, and East Worcestershire
 Fred Harris (lawyer) (1910–1979), American politician, judge and painter
 Fred Harris (British politician) (1915–1979), British businessman and politician
 Fred R. Harris (born 1930), American senator and presidential candidate

Sports
 Smokey Harris (Fred Thomas Wilfred Harris, 1890–1974), Canadian ice hockey player
 Fred Harris (footballer, born 1912) (1912–1998), English footballer for Birmingham City
 Fred Harris (rugby league) (fl. 1930s–1940s), English rugby league footballer for England, Leigh, and Leeds
 Frederick Harris (cricketer) (born 1934), English cricketer
 Fred Harris (Australian footballer) (1937–2019), Australian rules footballer
 Frederick Harris (judoka) (born 1984), Olympic judoka from Sierra Leone

Others
 Frederic R. Harris (1875–1949), American philatelist
 Frederick Brown Harris (1883–1970), American Methodist clergyman 
 Frederick John Harris (1937–1965), South African schoolteacher and anti-apartheid campaigner
 Fredric J. Harris (fl. 1970s–present), American professor of electrical engineering and signal processing

Other uses
 Frederick Harris Music, Canadian music publishing firm